Estrangement or Estranged  may refer to:
Family estrangement, the loss of a relationship between two or more family members
 Social alienation/isolation/estrangement, the loss of an individual's connection with society
 Estrangement effect, a performing arts concept coined by playwright Bertolt Brecht
 Self-estrangement, an idea by Karl Marx where a person is alienated from the products of labour
 Estrangement (album), released in August 2007 by the Ukrainian black metal band Drudkh
 Estrangement, an album by the German Gothic metal band Dreadful Shadows released in 1994
 "Estranged" (song), a power ballad and music video by the American hard rock band Guns N' Roses
 Estranged (band), a Malaysian alternative rock band
 Estranged (film), a 2006 20-minute short film directed by D. J. Matrundola